The 2016 Dubai World Cup was a horse race held at Meydan Racecourse on Saturday 26 March 2016. It was the 21st running of the Dubai World Cup. It was the second running of the race since the synthetic Tapeta surface was replaced by a dirt track.

The winner was California Chrome LLC's California Chrome, a five-year-old chestnut horse trained in the United States by Art Sherman and ridden by Victor Espinoza. California Chrome's victory was the first in the race for his jockey, trainer and owner.

The contenders
The race attracted a strong North American challenge headed by the 2014 American Horse of the Year California Chrome, who had finished second in the race in 2015. The other runners from the United States were Keen Ice, Frosted (Wood Memorial Stakes, Al Maktoum Challenge, Round 2, second in the Belmont Stakes), Mshawish (Gulfstream Park Turf Handicap, Donn Handicap) and Hoppertunity (Clark Handicap). The United Arab Emirates was represented by Mubtaahij (UAE Derby), Special Fighter (Al Maktoum Challenge, Round 3) and Candy Boy (fourth in the 2015 race). The Japanese dirt specialist Hokku Tarumae ran in the race for the third time, whilst the other three runners were Vadamos from France, Gun Pit from Hong Kong and Teletext from Saudi Arabia.

Betting is illegal in Dubai, but British bookmakers made California Chrome and Frosted the 15/8 joint favourites ahead of Mshawish (9/1), Special Fighter (10/1) and Keen Ice (12/1).

The race
Frankie Dettori sent Mshawish into the lead from the start and set the pace, with California Chrome (on the outside), Mubtaahij (on the rail) and Special Fighter close behind. There was little change in the order until the final turn although Frosted made progress to join the leading group. California Chrome overtook the tiring Mshawish early in the straight and quickly opened up a clear advantage. Mubtaahij, Special Fighter and Frosted maintained their positions without being able to quicken and Hoppertunity made rapid progress from the rear of the field. California Chrome crossed the finish line three and three-quarter lengths clear of Mubtaahij who was a neck in front of Hoppertunity whilst Special Fighter took fourth place just ahead of Frosted, Mshawish and Candy Boy. Keen Ice finished eighth ahead of Hokko Tarumae, with the other three runners tailed off. Impressively, California Chrome won despite his saddle slipping badly in deep stretch, which compromised Espinoza's ability to safely control his mount.

Race details
 Sponsor: Emirates Airline
 Purse: £6,802,701; First prize: £4,081,633
 Surface: Dirt
 Going: Fast
 Distance: 10 furlongs
 Number of runners: 12
 Winner's time: 2:01.83

Full result

 Abbreviations: nse = nose; nk = neck; shd = head; hd = head

Winner's details
Further details of the winner, California Chrome
 Sex: Stallion
 Foaled: 18 February 2011
 Country: United States
 Sire: Lucky Pulpit; Dam: Love The Chase (Not For Love)
 Owner: California Chrome LLC
 Breeder: Perry Martin & Steve Coburn

References

Dubai World Cup
Dubai World Cup
Dubai World Cup
Dubai World Cup